Frederick Freeman Proctor (March 17, 1851 – September 4, 1929), aka F. F. Proctor, was a vaudeville impresario who pioneered the method of continuous vaudeville. He opened the Twenty-third Street Theatre in New York City.

Bio
Frederick Freeman Proctor was born to Alpheus Proctor and Lucy Ann Tufts in Dexter, Maine, where his father was a physician. According to vaudeville historian Joe Laurie Jr., Proctor broke into show business when a performer known as "Levantine" noticed him working out at the YMCA and recruited him as a partner in his act, which involved juggling barrels with his feet. Proctor later made a successful foray into European variety under the name "Levantine" before moving into theatrical management. From 1880 to 1889 he and his partner H. Jacob opened and operated theaters in Albany, Schenectady, Rochester, Utica, Buffalo, Syracuse, Brooklyn, Troy, New Haven, Bridgeport, Hartford, Lancaster, Lynn, Wilmington and Worcester. In 1889, he opened his most famous theater, Proctor's Twenty-third Street, between Sixth and Seventh Avenues in Manhattan. Emulating B.F. Keith's innovation in Boston, Proctor began presenting "continuous vaudeville" on 23rd Street. He later teamed up for a time with Keith but the partnership broke up. At his height, Proctor had a chain of fifty theaters. In 1929, he sold his remaining eleven to RKO (Radio-Keith-Orpheum).

Newark, New Jersey
Warren G. Harris writes: 
Proctor's [at 116 Market Street] in downtown Newark was one of the rare 'double decker' theatres. Designed by architect John William Merrow, the eight-story complex had a large 2,300-seat theatre at ground level and a smaller theatre of about 900 seats occupying the top four floors beneath the roof. This fairly narrow building contained only the lobby of the larger theatre, which had its auditorium behind it. Very little has been reported about the operation of the upstairs theatre, which was apparently seldom used until the early 1960s, when it was renovated for the presentation of "foreign" films as the Penthouse Cinema. But the main theatre, with its cavernous two balconies, was always one of Newark's leaders, first with vaudeville only and eventually taken over by movies exclusively. When all of F.F. Proctor's theatres were acquired by Radio-Keith-Orpheum, it became known as RKO Proctor's. The theatre eventually fell victim to the urban decline of Newark and to RKO's merger with Stanley-Warner, which operated the nearby and larger Branford. The new management decided to close Proctor's, and it has been standing more or less derelict ever since.

Schenectady, New York

Proctor opened his first theater in Schenectady, New York in 1912, near the Erie Canal. On April 14, 1925, ground was broken for the "new" Proctor's Theatre in Schenectady, New York at its present site. Designed by famed theater architect Thomas W. Lamb, the theater cost $1.5 million to build and had a seating capacity of 2,700. On December 27, 1926, Proctor's Theatre opened with a showing of Stranded in Paris, a silent film starring Bebe Daniels.

Inside was a $50,000 Wurlitzer organ. Over 7,100 paid admissions were collected. In 1928, sound equipment was installed for the "talkies". On May 22, 1930, Proctor's was the site of the first public demonstration of television. An orchestra led by the image of a conductor that was sent from the General Electric laboratories over a mile away, and projected onto a seven-foot screen. The experiment was by Ernst Alexanderson.

RKO
In 1929, the chain was sold to the Radio-Keith-Orpheum Corporation (RKO).

Death
Frederick F. Proctor died in 1929 at his home in Larchmont, New York, aged 78 years; death was due to congestion of his lungs.

References

He built and lived at 90 Park Avenue in Larchmont, New York.

External links
 Frederick Freeman Proctor at Findagrave

Further reading
William Moulton Marston; and John Henry Feller; F.F. Proctor, Vaudeville Pioneer (1943)
Richard Butsch; The Making of American Audiences: From Stage to Television, 1750-1990 

1851 births
1929 deaths
American entertainment industry businesspeople
Deaths from lung disease
People from Dexter, Maine
Businesspeople from Schenectady, New York
People from Larchmont, New York
Vaudeville producers
Businesspeople from Maine
Burials at Woodlawn Cemetery (Bronx, New York)